The Guanghua Temple, also known as the South Mountain Guanghua Temple, is a Buddhist temple located at the foot of Mount Phoenix, about  south of Putian City, Fujian Province, People's Republic of China.

Built in the penultimate year of the Southern Chen dynasty (588 CE), it is one of the most influential Chinese Buddhism temples in China as well as one of the most scenic visitor attractions in Fujian Province.

Location

History and development

Ancient times
Constructed in 558 CE, the second year of Emperor Wu of Chen's Yongding era, the temple was originally called the Jinxian Monastery, after its first abbot, Master Jinxian. In 589 CE, founding Sui dynasty Emperor Wen, a Buddhist adherent, extended the building and renamed it the "Guanghua Temple".

During Emperor Xuanzong of Tang's reign (685–762 CE), Indian monks came to discuss and lecture on Buddhism at the temple. Xuanzong also built a tower in the grounds. The temple changed its name again during the Tang dynasty when in 771 CE, the second year of his Jingyun era, Emperor Ruizong of Tang dubbed it the Lingyan Temple and had a signboard created by the renowned calligrapher Liu Gongquan.

Finally, during the early reign of Emperor Taizong of Song (r. 976–997 CE), the temple once more became the Guanghua Temple.

The establishment flourished during the Song (1279–1368) and Ming (1368–1644) Dynasties. Along with Fuzhou's Gushan Spring Temple, Quanzhou's Kaiyuan Temple, and Xiamen's Nanputuo Temple, the Guanghua Temple was known as one of the four great Buddhist monasteries or Conglin of Fujian Province.

In 1341 CE the Guanghua Monastery was destroyed during a war then rebuilt between 1368 and 1424 CE only to be once more razed to the ground by fire in 1562. In the second half of the sixteenth century the monastery underwent alterations and reconstruction.

Qing Kangxi Emperor carried out a comprehensive building program at the temple during 1692 and merged it with the nearby Fahai Temple.

Modern era
By 1886 only the Avalokitesvara Pavilion, with two resident monks, remained of the monastery.

In 1890 Shanhe became president of the Guanghua Monastery and began a rebuilding program. The Jeweled Hall of the Great Heroes, Parlour, the Mediation Hall, the Abbot's Room and the Brahma-carya Hall were all rebuilt to form the present-day complex. Master Benru built the additional Sutra Pavilion as an extension to the Dharma Hall, after Emperor Xuantong's 1910 donation of more than 7,000 rolls of Dragon Sutra. In 1933, the Avalokitesvara Pavilion and the Heavenly King Palace were also rebuilt.

Until 1949 monasteries were built in other Southeast Asian countries by monks of the Guanghua Monastery to spread Chinese Buddhism. Presently, the Guanghua Monastery has seven branches in the Malay Peninsula and Indonesia.

At the foundation of the People's Republic of China in 1949 the temple had a resident population of 60 monks, a figure which by 1965 had declined to 57. Used as a factory for a period during the turmoil of the Cultural Revolution (1966–1976), the monks were dispelled and all statues of deities smashed.

With opening up and reform during the late 1970s and the advent of religious freedom, Master Yuanchan from the Yechengguang Garden Temple in Indonesia together with other overseas Chinese began to support the Guanghua Temple. In 1979, a six-year restoration program began under the supervision of then 70-year-old Venerable Master Yuanzhou.

In 1983 the temple became one of the Chinese Buddhism Regional Temples whilst 36-year-old Master Yiran became abbot. The same year, Venerable Master Yuanzhou funded the establishment of the new Fujian Buddhism Academy on the site.

During the summer of 1996, in association with the Buddhist Association of China, more than 300 novice monks were initiated over a 108-day period. As of 2010, there are around 250 resident monks at the Guanghua Temple.

Recent Abbots 
 1979–1986, Venerable Master Yuanzhou
 1986–1990, Master Yiran
 1990–2021 Master Xuecheng
 2021–Present Master Benxing

Structure 
The temple's principal features are as follows:
 Memorial Arch
 Fangsheng Pool (literally, Pool of Rebirth)
 Gaoshan Gate (Tall Mountain Gate)
 Tianwang Palace (Hall of the Four Heavenly Kings)
 Mahavira (Hall of the Great Hero)
 Fatang (Buddhist Hall)
 Jialan Palace (Sangharama Hall)
 Sanzang Palace (Tripiţaka Hall)
 Dizang Palace (Hall of Ksitigarbha)

In front of the temple there is a 10-metre stone staircase with 199 steps .

See also 
 Temple of Great Compassion
 Nanshan Temple
 Ashin Jinarakkhita

Notes

References

Sources

Further reading

External links
 Voice of Longquan (Official site), Guanghua Monastery
 another official site, with a longer history

Buddhist temples in Putian
Pagodas in China
6th-century Buddhist temples
Towers completed in the 6th century
6th-century establishments in China
Religious organizations established in the 6th century
Religious buildings and structures completed in 588